A biennial plant is a flowering plant that, generally in a temperate climate, takes two years to complete its biological life cycle.

In its first year, the biennal plant undergoes primary growth, during which its vegetative structures (leaves, stems, and roots) develop. Usually, the stem of the plant remains short and the leaves are low to the ground, forming a rosette. After one year's growing season, the plant enters a period of dormancy for the colder months. Many biennials require a cold treatment, or vernalization, before they will flower. During the next spring or summer, the stem of the biennial plant elongates greatly, or "bolts". The plant then flowers, producing fruits and seeds before it finally dies. There are far fewer biennials than either perennial plants or annual plants.

Biennials do not always follow a strict two-year life cycle and the majority of plants in the wild can take 3 or more years to fully mature. Rosette leaf size has been found to predict when a plant may enter its second stage of flowering and seed production. Alternatively, under extreme climatic conditions, a biennial plant may complete its life cycle rapidly (e.g., in three months instead of two years). This is quite common in vegetable or flower seedlings that were vernalized before they were planted in the ground. This behavior leads to many normally biennial plants being treated as annuals in some areas. Conversely, an annual grown under extremely favorable conditions may have highly successful seed propagation, giving it the appearance of being biennial or perennial. Some short-lived perennials may appear to be biennial rather than perennial. True biennials flower only once, while many perennials will flower every year once mature.

Biennials grown for flowers, fruits, or seeds are grown for two years, where those grown for edible leaves or roots are harvested after one year—and are not kept a second year to run to seed.

Examples of biennial plants are members of the onion family including leek, some members of the cabbage family, common mullein, parsley, fennel, Lunaria, silverbeet, black-eyed Susan, sweet William, colic weed, carrot, and some hollyhocks. Plant breeders have produced annual cultivars of several biennials that will flower the first year from seed, for example, foxglove and stock.

See also

References

 
Garden plants